Agliè (Piedmontese: Ajé) is a comune (municipality) in the Metropolitan City of Turin in the Italian region Piedmont, located about  north of Turin.

Agliè borders the following municipalities: San Martino Canavese, Torre Canavese, Bairo, Vialfrè, Cuceglio, San Giorgio Canavese, and Ozegna.

Main sights
Agliè's main attraction is its Castello Ducale, one of the Residences of the Royal House of Savoy, listed in the UNESCO World Heritage Sites. Dating from the 12th century, it was originally a possession of the counts of San Martino. In the 17th century, it was turned into a rich residence by count Filippo d'Agliè, but was ravaged during the French invasion of 1706.

In 1765 it was acquired by Charles Emmanuel III of Savoy and sold to his son Benedetto of Savoy who had it radically renewed ten years later, under design by Ignazio Birago di Bòrgaro. Thenceforth it was a summer residence for the Kings of Sardinia. It was sold to the Italian state in 1939.

It has a monumental façade with two stairs and a fountain; the interior includes 300 rooms, mostly provided with contemporary furniture. The castle is surrounded by large English- and Italian-style gardens. It was used as the location for the Italian series Elisa di Rivombrosa as Rivombrosa.

Other sights include:
Church of Santa Marta, an example of Baroque architecture by Costanzo Michela
Parrocchiale di San Massimo, annexed to the castle
Villa Meleto, a 19th-century countryside residence used by the poet Guido Gozzano
Church of San Gaudenzio, where Gozzano is buried.

References

External links
 Statute of the Comune di Agliè
 Agliè Online
 Castello di Agliè 

Canavese
Cities and towns in Piedmont